Presicce-Acquarica is a comune (municipality) in the Province of Lecce in the Italian region Apulia.

It was established on 15 May 2019 by the merger of the municipalities of Presicce and Acquarica del Capo.

References

Cities and towns in Apulia